Auburn, also known as Auburn Farm, is a historic home and farm located near Brandy Station, Culpeper County, Virginia. It was built about 1855–1856, and is a three-story, three bay by three bay frame dwelling, built in the Greek Revival style. It features a two-story portico with a heavy entablature including triglyph and metope frieze.  Also on the property are the contributing kitchen (c. 1855–1856); 20th-century garage, chicken house, meat house, and machine shed; two barns; a large corncrib; and two tenant houses.

It was listed on the National Register of Historic Places in 2008.

References

Houses on the National Register of Historic Places in Virginia
Farms on the National Register of Historic Places in Virginia
Greek Revival houses in Virginia
Houses completed in 1856
Houses in Culpeper County, Virginia
National Register of Historic Places in Culpeper County, Virginia
1855 establishments in Virginia